Batahir (in Albanian) or Bataire (in Serbian) is a village in the municipality of Mitrovica in the District of Mitrovica, Kosovo. According to the 2011 census, it didn't have any inhabitant.

Notes

References 

Villages in Mitrovica, Kosovo

fr:Bataire